Clifford Frederick "Cliff" Rodgers (3 October 1921 – 1990) was an English professional footballer who played as a full back in the Football League for York City, in non-League football for RAF Pocklington, Scarborough and Goole Town and was on the books of Crystal Palace without making a league appearance.

References

1921 births
Footballers from Rotherham
1990 deaths
English footballers
Association football fullbacks
Crystal Palace F.C. players
York City F.C. players
Scarborough F.C. players
Goole Town F.C. players
English Football League players